Roland Schmitt may refer to:

Roland W. Schmitt
Roland Schmitt (French footballer)
Roland Schmitt (German footballer), manager of TSV Hoffenheim